Wombarra railway station is located on the South Coast railway line in New South Wales, Australia. It serves the village of Wombarra opening for first miner passengers on the down line on 7 December 1916 named as Wombarra (Illawarra Mercury 15 December 1916).

Platforms & services
Wombarra has two side platforms and is serviced by NSW TrainLink South Coast line services travelling between Waterfall and Port Kembla. Some peak hour and late night services operate to Sydney Central, Bondi Junction and Kiama.

References

External links

Wombarra station details Transport for New South Wales

Buildings and structures in Wollongong
Railway stations in Australia opened in 1917
Regional railway stations in New South Wales
Short-platform railway stations in New South Wales, 6 cars